LG7 or variation, may refer to:

 Buick LG7, a Buick V6 engine
 Lower Group 7, of the Bushveld Igneous Complex
 Liancheng Jinhe metro station (station code LG07) on the Wanda–Zhonghe–Shulin line in New Taipei, Taiwan
 Daugavpils District (LG07), Latvia; see List of FIPS region codes (J–L)

See also

 LG (disambiguation)